Viljami Aittokoski (born 13 March 2002) is a Finnish footballer who plays as a midfielder.

References

2002 births
Living people
Finnish footballers
Finland youth international footballers
Association football midfielders
Pallo-Kerho 37 players
Kuopion Palloseura players
SC Kuopio Futis-98 players
Kakkonen players